John Crosbie, 2nd Earl of Glandore PC, FRS (25 May 1753 – 23 October 1815), styled Viscount Crosbie between 1777 and 1781, was an Irish politician.

Crosbie was the only surviving son of William Crosbie, 1st Earl of Glandore, by his first wife Lady Theodosia, daughter of John Bligh, 1st Earl of Darnley. He was educated at Trinity College, Cambridge. In 1775 he was returned to the Irish House of Commons for Athboy. The following year he was elected for both Tralee and Ardfert. He chose to sit for the latter, and held the seat until 1781, when he succeeded his father in the earldom and entered the Irish House of Lords. He was sworn of the Irish Privy Council in 1785. In 1789, he was appointed Joint Master of the Rolls in Ireland alongside the Earl of Carysfort. They both held the post until 1801. The office was then a sinecure and did not require any legal qualifications. In 1800, he was elected as one of the 28 original Irish Representative Peers to sit in the House of Lords.

Lord Glandore was married in London in 1771 by Frederick Cornwallis, Archbishop of Canterbury, to the Honourable Diana, daughter of George Germain, 1st Viscount Sackville. The marriage was childless. She died in August 1814, aged 58. Lord Glandore survived her by a year and died in October 1815, aged 62. The earldom and viscountcy of Crosbie became extinct on his death while he was succeeded in the Barony of Brandon by his cousin William Crosbie.

References

1753 births
1815 deaths
Earls in the Peerage of Ireland
Members of the Privy Council of Ireland
John
John
Fellows of the Royal Society
People educated at Kilkenny College
Alumni of Trinity College Dublin
Irish representative peers
Crosbie, John Crosbie, Viscount
Crosbie, John Crosbie, Viscount
Members of the Irish House of Lords
Masters of the Rolls in Ireland
Members of the Parliament of Ireland (pre-1801) for County Meath constituencies
Members of the Parliament of Ireland (pre-1801) for County Kerry constituencies